Snorsio Alston "Sio" Moore (born May 2, 1990) is a Liberian former American football linebacker. He played college football at Connecticut. Moore was drafted by the Oakland Raiders in the third round of the 2013 NFL Draft. He also played for the Indianapolis Colts, Kansas City Chiefs, Arizona Cardinals, and Houston Texans.

Early years
Moore was born in Liberia in West Africa, and moved to the West Haven, Connecticut when he was a child. He attended Apex High School in Apex, North Carolina, where he was a letterman in football and track. He played football as a linebacker, running back and fullback. He earned All-area and All-Tri Seven Football League honors as a fullback and linebacker as a senior.

Prior to signing with Connecticut, Moore made a visit to their summer camp in Storrs, Connecticut, where he was timed at 4.54 in the 40-yard dash, 4.41 in the short shuttle, had a 38.5-inch (99 cm) vertical jump, broad jumped 10-foot-2 (3.13 m) and ran the 100-meter dash in 11.1 seconds.

Regarded only as a two-star prospect grade by both Rivals.com and Scout.com, Moore was ranked No. 50 among the nation’s weak-side linebackers. He signed his national letter of intent to attend Connecticut on July 12, 2007.

College career
While attending the University of Connecticut, he played for the Connecticut Huskies football team from 2008 to 2012. During his college career, he totaled 274 tackles, 16 quarterback sacks and four interceptions. Following his senior season in 2012, he was a first-team All-Big East Conference selection and was invited to play in both the East-West Shrine Game and the Senior Bowl.

Professional career

Oakland Raiders
Moore was selected by the Oakland Raiders in the third round, with the 66th overall pick, of the 2013 NFL Draft. On October 27, 2013, Moore picked up 2 sacks and 5 tackles in a 21-18 win against the Pittsburgh Steelers.

Indianapolis Colts
On September 4, 2015, Moore was traded to the Indianapolis Colts for sixth round pick in the 2016 NFL draft. He was released by the Colts on October 4, 2016.

Kansas City Chiefs
Moore was signed by the Kansas City Chiefs on October 7, 2016. On November 1, 2016, he was released by the Chiefs.

Arizona Cardinals
On November 22, 2016, Moore was signed by the Arizona Cardinals.

Houston Texans
On June 3, 2017, Moore signed with the Houston Texans. On September 1, 2017, he was released by the Texans.

References

External links
 Oakland Raiders bio
 UConn Huskies bio

1990 births
Living people
American football linebackers
Arizona Cardinals players
UConn Huskies football players
Houston Texans players
Indianapolis Colts players
Kansas City Chiefs players
Liberian emigrants to the United States
Liberian players of American football
Oakland Raiders players
People from Apex, North Carolina
Players of American football from North Carolina
Sportspeople from Monrovia